Hrvatski akademski vaterpolo klub Mladost or simply HAVK Mladost is a professional water polo club based in Zagreb, Croatia. The club was formed in 1946 and it is part of the Mladost sports society. As of the 2021–22 season, it competes in the Croatian League, Regional League A1 and LEN Euro Cup.

Honours

Domestic competitions
 Croatian League
 Winners (11): 1991–92, 1992–93, 1993–94, 1994–95, 1995–96, 1996–97, 1998–99, 2001–02, 2002–03, 2007–08, 2020–21 
 Croatian Cup
 Winners (10): 1992–93, 1993–94, 1997–98, 1998–99, 2001–02, 2005–06, 2010–11, 2011–12, 2019–20 , 2020–21
 Yugoslav League (defunct)
 Winners (6): 1962, 1967, 1969, 1971, 1988–89, 1989–90
 Yugoslav Cup (defunct)
 Winners (1): 1988–89

European competitions
 LEN Champions League
 Winners (7): 1967–68, 1968–69, 1969–70, 1971–72, 1989–90, 1990–91, 1995–96
 Runners–up (4): 1970–71, 1992–93, 1996–97, 1999–2000
 LEN Cup Winners' Cup (defunct)
 Winners (2): 1975–76, 1998–99
 Runners–up (1): 2001–02
 LEN Cup
 Winners (1): 2000–01
 Runners–up (1): 2013–14
 LEN Super Cup
 Winners (3): 1976, 1989, 1996
 Runners–up (1): 1990–91

Regional competitions
 Regional Water Polo League
 Winners (2): 2018–19, 2019–20
 COMEN Cup (defunct)
 Winners (2): 1987, 1990

References

External links 
 

Water polo clubs in Croatia
Water polo clubs in Yugoslavia